KCLC (89.1 FM) is a radio station broadcasting an Album Adult Alternative format. Licensed to St. Charles, Missouri, United States, the station serves the St. Louis area.  The station is owned by Lindenwood University.

KCLC underwent major facility upgrades in late August 2010, including a new antenna and transmitter, new studio hardware and software, and the capability for HD broadcasting.  In 2022, KCLC dropped its longtime moniker "The Wood"

References

External links
KCLC official website

CLC
Lindenwood University
St. Charles, Missouri